The Kawasaki Heavy Industries & CRRC Qingdao Sifang C151C is the sixth generation electric multiple unit rolling stock in operation on the North–South Line of Singapore's Mass Rapid Transit (MRT) system, manufactured by a consortium of Kawasaki Heavy Industries (KHI) and CRRC Qingdao Sifang under Contract 151C.

Twelve trains were purchased. They were delivered between 2017 and 2019, and were tested before the full service in 2019. The first was delivered on 27 October 2017. The interior design was unveiled on 28 February 2018 at Tuas Depot with two trains showcased. This brought the total number of trains operating on the NSEWL to 198 trainsets, up from the previous 186. The addition tripled the number of trains on the North–South and East–West Lines when they were first opened.

The first three C151C trainsets commenced revenue service on 30 September 2018 on the North–South Line.

Tender 
The tender for these trains under the contract 151C was closed on 14 May 2015 with three bids. The LTA has shortlisted all of them and the tender results were published on 22 September that year. Kawasaki has won the contract, similar to C151A and C151B.

Design
The C151C is the first and only MRT rolling stock to be fitted with tip-up seats until April 2021 when the second batch of the CT251 trains entered service in tandem with the opening of the Thomson–East Coast Line Stage 2.

The C151C retains the design and specifications from the earlier C151B trains but spots LTA's new corporate livery already introduced on the C951(A) trains, incorporating green and red stripes against a black and white background.

The C151C is the second train type to be equipped with STARIS 2.0, which consists of two LCD screens displaying travel information and advertisements. Travel information includes upcoming stations and door closing warnings.

The C151C features an improved current collector device which can report information to the Train Integrated Management System (TIMS) if any collector shoe is sheared off the bogie.

Equipment

Main propulsion controller
The C151C trains are the fifth commuter type Electric Multiple Unit (EMU) made in Japan to feature electric systems fully manufactured by Fuji Electric. Propulsion is controlled by VVVF inverter with two-level IGBT semiconductor controller, rated at 415 kV. Each inverter unit controls two motors on one bogie (1C2M), and one motor car features two such units. Motors are three-phase AC induction type, model MLR109, with a maximum output of 140 kW.

Train formation
The configuration of a C151C in revenue service is DT–M1–M2+M2–M1–DT

The car numbers of the trains range from x701 to x724, where x depends on the carriage type. Individual cars are assigned a four-digit serial number. A complete six-car trainset consists of an identical twin set of one driving trailer (DT) and two motor (M) cars permanently coupled together. For example, set 705/706 consists of carriages 3705, 1705, 2705, 2706, 1706, and 3706.

 The first digit identifies the car number, where the first car has a 3, the second has a 1, and the third has a 2.
 The second digit is always a 7.
 The third digit and fourth digit are the train identification numbers. A full-length train of six cars has two different identification numbers. For example, 705/706 (normal coupling) or 705/720 (cross-coupling).
 Kawasaki and CRRC Qingdao Sifang built sets 701–724.

Doubts about the consortium

The award of the C151C turnkey contract to the Kawasaki Heavy Industries & CSR Qingdao Sifang consortium was briefly politicised in Singapore, when the defects from the relatively new C151A trains constructed by the same consortium were made public on 5 July 2016. This was after Gerald Giam from the Workers Party, commenting through an official Facebook post, doubted the decision by the Land Transport Authority to award the subsequent contracts, specifically both the design and supply of C151C and CT251 rail cars to the same consortium in 2015. This was despite the Land Transport Authority and operator SMRT Trains officially acknowledging the C151A crack defects as early as 2013.

References

Mass Rapid Transit (Singapore) rolling stock
Kawasaki multiple units
Train-related introductions in 2018
750 V DC multiple units
CRRC multiple units